This is a list of events that took place in Europe in 2018.

Events

January 
January 9 – The Church of St. Lambertus in Immerath, Germany is demolished.
January 15 – Romanian Prime Minister Mihai Tudose resigns after his Social Democratic Party leaders lost their support.
January 28 – Presidential elections were held in Finland.

February 
February 9 to 25 – Albania participated at the 2018 Winter Olympics in PyeongChang, South Korea.
February 12 – Niklasdorf train collision took place in Austria, resulting in 1 death and 22 injuries.
February 21 – Ján Kuciak was murdered in Slovakia.

March 
March 8 – The 2018 Spanish women's strike occurred in Spain.
March 13 – Russian exile Nikolai Glushkov is found dead at his home in London, United Kingdom.

April 
April 11 – Ilham Aliyev wins the 2018 presidential elections in Azerbaijan.
April 21 – Sweden hosted the 2018 World Mixed Doubles Curling Championship.
April 28 – Switzerland won the 2018 World Mixed Doubles Curling Championship.

May 
May 4 – Beginning of the 2018 Giro d'Italia.
May 12 – 2018 Paris knife attack occurred in Paris, France.
May 26 – The Icelandic municipal elections took place.
May 27 – End of the 2018 Giro d'Italia.
May 28 – Kremlin warns that the United States put military pressure in the European Union security at risk.

June 
June 1 – The Met Office confirms that May 2018 was the warmest May since 1910 in the UK and was also likely to be the sunniest since 1929.
June 10 – Human Chain for Basque Self-determination, 2018 took place in Spain.
June 27 – The British Medical Association (BMA) voted to oppose Brexit “as a whole”.

July

August

September 
September 10 to 30 – The 2018 FIVB Volleyball Men's World Championship will be co-hosted in Bulgaria and Italy.

October 
October 7 – The 2018 Bosnian general election is scheduled to take place.

November

December

Births

Deaths

References 

 
2010s in Europe
Years of the 21st century in Europe
Europe